Víctor Enrique Piríz Alves (born 22 June 1980 in Artigas, Uruguay) is a Uruguayan football player who plays as a forward.

Career
He debuted in the Uruguayan Primera División playing for Tacuarembó, where he played from 2002 to 2003. In that year he was transferred to Talleres de Córdoba in Argentina, where he had his best interests . With the Cordoba club was ranked 3rd in the Clausura 2004. Promoting played against Argentinos Juniors to validate the category but failed.

In 2004, Alves became Píriz Argentinos Juniors, computer that did not have good performances. In 2005, he played for Banfield, also Argentinos Juniors, and was its presentation in an international tournament as the Copa Libertadores.
Ended the cup had a stint by Arsenal de Sarandí to then saturate again in Talleres de Córdoba, this time playing on the First "B" national. When finished that season ended up in the Club San Luis Mexican championship. He went to Club Necaxa and the Draft League Ascent 2009 he moved to Club Tijuana. In January 2010 he was hired by the club Universitario de Deportes of Peru, where he served in a low yield until the end of the 2010 season.

The 2011–2012 season was very prominent in Defensa y Justicia, being the main scorer and scoring key goals, as a River Plate, Instituto, Quilmes, Rosario Central.

In 2012 by the club record Independiente Rivadavia.

In 2013 signed to Atlético Tucumán becoming his first goal against rival classic, San Martin de Tucuman in the match which ended 3–1 in favor of the Decanos.El February 22, 2014 ahead and scored his first official goal with the blue and white when he played extra time in the tie against Ferro. Would mark his third goal (the second officer) in the 3–1 victory on the road against one of the big five of Argentina, Independiente de Avellaneda

Honours

Club
Tijuana
Liga de Ascenso Mexico: 2010–11

External links
 
 
 Profile & Statistics at Guardian's Stats Centre
 Víctor Píriz at BDFA

1980 births
Living people
People from Artigas, Uruguay
Uruguayan footballers
Uruguayan expatriate footballers
Association football forwards
Tacuarembó F.C. players
Talleres de Córdoba footballers
Argentinos Juniors footballers
Club Atlético Banfield footballers
Arsenal de Sarandí footballers
San Luis F.C. players
Club Necaxa footballers
Club Tijuana footballers
Club Universitario de Deportes footballers
Defensa y Justicia footballers
Independiente Rivadavia footballers
Atlético Tucumán footballers
Guillermo Brown de Puerto Madryn footballers
Barracas Central players
Deportivo Armenio footballers
Argentine Primera División players
Primera Nacional players
Primera B Metropolitana players
Torneo Federal A players
Peruvian Primera División players
Uruguayan Segunda División players
Liga MX players
Expatriate footballers in Argentina
Expatriate footballers in Mexico
Expatriate footballers in Peru
Uruguayan expatriate sportspeople in Argentina
Uruguayan expatriate sportspeople in Mexico
Uruguayan expatriate sportspeople in Peru